Garibon Ka Daata is a 1989 Indian Hindi-language film directed by Ramesh Ahuja, starring Mithun Chakraborty, Bhanupriya, Sumeet Saigal, Kader Khan, Prem Chopra, Divya Rana, Aruna Irani, Shakti Kapoor, Lalita Pawar, Asrani and Dhananjay Singh

Plot

Garibon Ka Daata is an action film with  Mithun Chakraborty and Sumeet Saigal playing the lead roles, supported by Bhanupriya, Kader Khan, Prem Chopra and Shakti Kapoor.

Cast
Mithun Chakraborty Gopi Prasad
Bhanupriya
Sumeet Saigal Prakash Kapoor
Kader Khan
Prem Chopra Natwarlal
Divya Rana
Aruna Irani
Shakti Kapoor Kamlesh Singh
Lalita Pawar
Asrani
Dhananjay Singh

Songs
Lyrics: Anand Bakshi

"Oh Soniye" - Mohammed Aziz, Lata Mangeshkar
"Duniya Me Kaam Karo, Kaam Karo Naam Karo" - Shailendra Singh, Alka Yagnik, Anup Jalota
"Ek Ladki Kal Mili Thi, Mil Jaaye Aaj PhirTo" - Mohammed Aziz, S Janaki
"Ekk Do Teen Char" - Sudesh Bhosle, Alisha Chinai
"Meri Dulari Jaan Se Pyari" - Shailendra Singh, Mahendra Kapoor, Usha Mangeshkar

External links
 

1989 films
1980s Hindi-language films
Indian action films
Films scored by Bappi Lahiri
1989 action films
Hindi-language action films